PlantUML is an open-source tool allowing users to create diagrams from a plain text language. Besides various UML diagrams, PlantUML has support for various other software development related formats (such as Archimate, Block diagram, BPMN, C4, Computer network diagram, ERD, Gantt chart, Mind map, and WBD), as well as visualisation of JSON and YAML files.

The language of PlantUML is an example of a domain-specific language. Besides its own DSL, PlantUML also understands AsciiMath, Creole, DOT, and LaTeX. It uses Graphviz software to lay out its diagrams and Tikz for LaTeX support. Images can be output as PNG, SVG, LaTeX and even ASCII art.  PlantUML has also been used to allow blind people to design and read UML diagrams.

Applications that use PlantUML 

There are various extensions or add-ons that incorporate PlantUML.

 Atom has a community maintained PlantUML syntax highlighter and viewer.
 Confluence wiki has a PlantUML plug-in for Confluence Server, which renders diagrams on-the-fly during a page reload. There is an additional PlantUML plug-in for Confluence Cloud.
 Doxygen integrates diagrams for which sources are provided after the \startuml command.
 Eclipse has a PlantUML plug-in.
 Google Docs has an add-on called PlantUML Gizmo that works with the PlantUML.com server.
 IntelliJ IDEA can create and display diagrams embedded into Markdown (built-in) or in standalone files (using a plugin).
 LaTeX using the Tikz package has limited support for PlantUML.
 LibreOffice has Libo_PlantUML extension to use PlantUML diagrams.
 MediaWiki has a PlantUML plug-in which renders diagrams in pages as SVG or PNG.
 Microsoft Word can use PlantUML diagrams via a Word Template Add-in. There is an additional Visual Studio Tools for Office add-in called PlantUML Gizmo that works in a similar fashion.
 NetBeans has a PlantUML plug-in.
 Notepad++ has a PlantUML plug-in.
 Org-mode has a PlantUML org-babel support.
 Rider has a PlantUML plug-in.
 Visual Studio Code has various PlantUML extensions on its marketplace, most popular being PlantUML by jebbs.
Vnote open source notetaking markdown application has built in PlantUML support.
 Xcode has a community maintained Source Editor Extension to generate and view PlantUML class diagrams from Swift source code.

Text format to communicate UML at source code level 
PlantUML uses well-formed and human-readable code to render the diagrams.

There are other text formats for UML modelling but PlantUML supports many diagram types and does not need an explicit layout, though it is possible to tweak the diagrams if necessary.

Example 
The source code for the class diagram shown on the right is as follows:

skinparam style strictuml
class Façade {
 doSomething()
}
Façade .> package1.Class1
Façade .> package2.Class2
Façade .> package3.Class3
Client1 .> Façade : doSomething()
Client2 .> Façade : doSomething()
note as N2
doSomething() {
  Class1 c1 = newClass1();
  Class2 c2 = newClass2();
  Class3 c3 = newClass3();
  c1.doStuff(c2)
  c3.setX(c1.getX());
  return c3.getY();
}
end note
Façade .. N2

See also

 UMLet 
 AsciiDoc
 YEd
 Mermaid
 List of Unified Modeling Language tools

References

External links
 Official website

Charts
Classic Mac OS software
Programming tools
Cross-platform software
Data visualization software
Diagramming software
Diagrams
Free software
Free UML tools
Graph description languages
Graph drawing software
Java platform software
Java (programming language) software
MacOS text-related software
Software for modeling software
UML tools
Unified Modeling Language
Unix software
Windows text-related software